Mazar-i-Sharif International Airport (Meydâne Havâyeye Mazâre Šarif) , also known as Mawlānā Jalāl ad-Dīn Muhammad Balkhī International Airport, is located 9 km east of Mazar-i-Sharif in northern Afghanistan, a 15-minute drive from the center of the city. Though it was originally constructed with 2 parallel runways, the northernmost runway has since been converted into a Taxiway. The airport has facilities for up to 1,000 passengers, making it one of the largest airports in Afghanistan.

Originally built in the 1960s in part by the United States, the airport serves the northern Afghan population. In 2013, a 60 million euro terminal was added to the airport while the older terminal is now used for domestic flights.

The airport was also home to the Afghan Air Force 4th (304th) Wing.

In August 2021, the air base fell to the Taliban after a surrender by government forces. The Taliban does not yet have an air force which can be deployed from the airfield, although it has captured weaponry and vehicles from the Afghan National Army and Afghan Air Force.

History

Early years

Mazar-i-Sharif Airport was built in the 1960s by the United States during the Cold War, when the Soviets and the Americans were engaged in spreading their influences in the Middle East and South Asia. Between the 1960s and late 1970s, for the first time large number of tourists began arriving to see historical places in the city.

The airport was heavily used in the 1980s by the Soviet forces from which they launched daily flight missions to hit targets in the Mujahideen controlled territories of Afghanistan. It also served as one of the main hubs for deploying troops from the neighboring former Soviet Union.

21st century

Germany took command of the International Security Assistance Force (ISAF)'s Regional Area North at the end of March 2006. The airfield functioned as a main hub for the exchange of personnel as well as air cargo for the international stabilisation and peace support forces in northern Afghanistan. From September 2007 a TACAN installation for an instrument landing system was available for bad weather operation. Camp Marmal was built next to the airport in 2005, which gradually expanded to one of the largest military bases in Afghanistan. It served all ISAF personnel, including U.S. and Afghan Armed Forces.

On 30 June 2014 the Royal Netherlands Air Force detachment of General Dynamics F-16 Fighting Falcon's ended.

Work on a new international terminal began in 2010 and was completed in 2013. A special inauguration ceremony was held in June 2013, which was attended by German Foreign Minister Guido Westerwelle, Afghanistan's Transport and Aviation Minister Daoud Ali Najafi, Balkh's Governor Atta Muhammad Nur and some parliamentarians. After the inauguration, the airport was named Maulana Jalaluddin Balkhi International Airport. The expansion of the airport was a joint venture of Germany and the United Arab Emirates (UAE), cost 60 million euros and took about three years to complete. The project was overseen by a Turkish company. The airport's new international terminal takes its name from Maulana Jalaluddin Balkhi, also known as Rumi.

Airlines and destinations

 the following airlines serve Mazar-i-Sharif International Airport:

See also
List of airports in Afghanistan
Rail transport in Afghanistan

References

External links

 , January 5, 2018, Resolute Support Mission.
Mazari Sharif Airport Information
Afghanistan to Open Third International Airport in Early 2012
Mazari Sharif Airport military role
 
 Airport record for Mazar-e-Sharif Airport at Landings.com

Airports in Afghanistan
Mazar-i-Sharif
Afghanistan–United States relations